Cengiz Ünder (born 14 July 1997) is a Turkish professional footballer who plays as a right winger for Ligue 1 club Marseille and the Turkey national team.

Club career

Early career
Ünder began his professional career at Altinordu, and later transferred to Başakşehir. In his breakout season with Başakşehir, Ünder established himself as one of the best players in the league, scoring 7 goals in 32 games in his debut season in the Süper Lig.

Roma

On 16 July 2017, he became a Roma player for a €13.4 million fee. He scored his first goal for Roma in a 1–0 win over Hellas Verona in the Serie A on 4 February 2018. In the same month, he marked his Champions League debut with a goal; the opener in a 1–2 loss to Shakhtar Donetsk in the first leg of the first round of knockout fixtures, becoming the youngest Turkish player ever to score in the Champions League.

Leicester City (loan)
On 20 September 2020, Ünder signed for Premier League club Leicester City on a season-long loan, with the option of a permanent transfer. He made his debut in a 3–0 defeat to West Ham United, coming on as a substitute. On 25 October, he made his first goal contribution for Leicester when he assisted Jamie Vardy's winning goal in a 1–0 away win over Arsenal, which ended Leicester's 47 year wait for a victory away at Arsenal. On 10 December, Ünder scored his first Leicester goal in a 2–0 home win over AEK Athens in the UEFA Europa League.

Marseille (loan)

On 4 July 2021, he signed on loan for Ligue 1 club Marseille, with an option to be bought of €9 million.

International career
Ünder has represented the U18 and U19 levels of the Turkey national youth football team. He most recently was called up to the Turkey national under-21 football team.

In November 2016 Ünder received his first call-up to the senior Turkey squad for the match against Kosovo. He scored his first international goal in his second cap for his country in a friendly victory against Moldova in March 2017.

Controversy
Following the Afrin offensive in Northern Syria, which was carried out by the Turkish Armed Forces in January 2018, on 11 February, Ünder performed a military salute as a goal celebration after netting in Roma's 5–2 home win over Benevento in Serie A. In October 2019, following the Turkish offensive into north-eastern Syria, Ünder posted a picture of the aforementioned celebration on Twitter; his controversial post drew criticism on social media from Roma fans.

Career statistics

Club

International 

Scores and results list Turkey's goal tally first, score column indicates score after each Ünder goal.

Honours

Individual 
Awards
Turkish Footballer of the Year: 2018

References

External links

 
 
 Marseille Profile
 
 Personal Website
 

1997 births
Living people
People from Sındırgı
Association football forwards
Turkish footballers
Turkey international footballers
Turkey youth international footballers
Altınordu F.K. players
İstanbul Başakşehir F.K. players
A.S. Roma players
Leicester City F.C. players
Olympique de Marseille players
TFF First League players
Ligue 1 players
Serie A players
Premier League players
Süper Lig players
Turkish expatriate footballers
Expatriate footballers in Italy
Expatriate footballers in England
Expatriate footballers in France
Turkish expatriate sportspeople in Italy
Turkish expatriate sportspeople in England
UEFA Euro 2020 players